A round barrow is a type of tumulus and is one of the most common types of archaeological monuments. Although concentrated in Europe, they are found in many parts of the world, probably because of their simple construction and universal purpose.

In Britain, most of them were built between 2200BC and 1100BC.  This was the Late Neolithic period to the Late Bronze Age.  Later Iron Age barrows were mostly different, and sometimes square.

Description 
At its simplest, a round barrow is a hemispherical mound of earth and/or stone raised over a burial placed in the middle. Beyond this there are numerous variations which may employ surrounding ditches, stone kerbs or flat berms between ditch and mound. Construction methods range from a single creation process of heaped material to a complex depositional sequence involving alternating layers of stone, soil and turf with timbers or wattle used to help hold the structure together.

The center may be placed a stone chamber or cist or in a cut grave. Both intact inhumations and cremations placed in vessels can be found.

Many round barrows attract surrounding satellite burials or later ones inserted into the mound itself. In some cases these occur hundreds or even thousands of years after the original barrow was built and were placed by entirely different cultures.

Numerous subtypes include the bell barrow, bowl barrow, saucer barrow and disc barrow.

Examples

Scandinavia

Denmark 
Denmark has many tumuli, including round barrows. The round barrows here were built over a very broad span of time and culture, from the Neolithic Stone Age to the Viking Age.  They show a large variation of construction design while sharing a common exterior look. Tumuli were protected by law in 1937.

Britain 
In Britain round barrows generally date to the Early Bronze Age although Neolithic examples are also known. Later round barrows were also sometimes used by Roman, Viking and Saxon societies. Examples include Rillaton barrow and Round Loaf. Where several contemporary round barrows are grouped together, the area is referred to as a barrow cemetery.

England

Lincolnshire 
Beacon Hill, near Cleethorpes
Bully Hill, near Tealby
Bully Hills, Gräberfeld near Tathwell
Burgh on Bain, Barrows near Burgh on Bain
Burwell Wood, Barrows near Muckton
Buslingthorpe, near Buslingthorpe
Butterbumps, Gräberfeld near Willoughby
Cleatham Barrow, near Manton
Donnington-on-Bain, near Donington on Bain
Folk Moot & Butt Mound, near Silk Willoughby
Fordington Barrows, near Ulceby
Grim's Mound, near Burgh on Bain
Hagworthingham, near Hagworthingham
Hatcliffe Barrow, near Hatcliffe
Howe Hill, near Ulceby
King's Hill, Barrow/Mound near Bardney
Ludford Barrow, near Ludford
Mill Hill, near Claxby
Revesby Barrows, near Revesby
Ring Holt, near Dalby

See also
 Kurgan
 Stupa
 Tumulus

References

External links

Round barrow and barrow cemetery search results from The Megalithic Portal.
Chart of Neolithic, Bronze Age and Celtic structures from Pretanic World.

Barrows in England
Tumuli

de:Nichtmegalithische Rundhügel